The Capital Express Route was an air route operated by Singapore Airlines between Singapore and Wellington via Canberra. It linked the capitals of three countries – Singapore, Australia and New Zealand – hence the name. The route was launched on 21 September 2016 using the Boeing 777-200ER aircraft, and the carrier became the first airline with flights between Canberra and Wellington.

A report by Australia's Bureau of Infrastructure, Transport and Regional Economics showed that the average load factor for the sector between Singapore and Canberra was about 83% in the early months of the service.

On 24 January 2018, the carrier announced a restructuring of the route which saw the sector between Canberra and Wellington being delinked. From 1 May 2018, Canberra was served via Sydney operating on a Singapore-Sydney-Canberra-Singapore routing. From 3 May 2018, Wellington was served via Melbourne on a Singapore-Melbourne-Wellington-Melbourne-Singapore routing. Since 1 November 2019 till its suspension, flights to Wellington were operated with the Airbus A350.

On 14 September 2020, it was announced that both cities would be suspended from regular service due to a drop in demand arising from the COVID-19 pandemic.

References 

Airline routes
Singapore Airlines